Joe Ackroyd (born 6 September 2002) is an English professional footballer who plays as a defensive midfielder for Buxton on loan from Barnsley.

Career
Ackroyd joined Barnsley as a 10-year-old in November 2012. On 8 January 2022, he made his senior debut as a substitute during extra time in a 5–4 win over Barrow in the FA Cup. On 25 February 2022, Ackroyd joined Czech National Football League side MFK Vyškov on loan until the end of the season. On 5 March 2022, he made his debut as a substitute in a 4–1 win over Opava.

On 27 September 2022, Ackroyd signed for Northern Premier League Premier Division club Guiseley on a one-month loan deal. The loan was extended before he was recalled on 16 December 2022, having made 13 appearances in all competitions. On 10 January 2023, Ackroyd joined National League North side Buxton on a one-month loan. The following month, the loan was extended.

References

External links

Guiseley stats

Living people
2002 births
English footballers
Footballers from Barnsley
Association football midfielders
Barnsley F.C. players
MFK Vyškov players
Guiseley A.F.C. players
Buxton F.C. players
National League (English football) players
Czech National Football League players
English expatriate footballers
Expatriate footballers in the Czech Republic
English expatriate sportspeople in the Czech Republic
Northern Premier League players